Leandro Fonseca may refer to:
Leandro da Fonseca Euzebio, or simply Leandro (born 1981), Brazilian central defender who currently plays for Omiya Ardija on loan from Cruzeiro
Leandro Fonseca (born 1975),  Brazilian football player who currently plays for Yverdon